Rig-e Sefid (also Romanized as Rīg-e Sefīd; also known as Eslāmābād, Rīg Sepīd, and Rīkh Asbī) is a village in Doab Rural District, in the Central District of Selseleh County, Lorestan Province, Iran. At the 2006 census, its population was 30, in 7 families.

References 

Towns and villages in Selseleh County